Micraspis striata is a species of ladybird. It was described by Johan Christian Fabricius in 1792.

References

Beetles described in 1792
Coccinellidae